NBCUniversal's Universal Destinations & Experiences contain rides, attractions, shopping, dining, and additional experiences based on a wide variety of media franchises. The following tables list almost every self-owned and third-party/external franchise that appear within them:

NBCUniversal-owned properties
Every franchise owned by NBCUniversal that has previously or is currently represented within their theme parks and resort hotels:

Licensed properties
Most of the licensed properties, not owned by NBCUniversal, that are currently represented within the Universal Parks & Resorts:

Notes
Because of the acquisition of certain companies listed here, The Walt Disney Company owns the rights to Marvel and 20th Century Studios franchises.

See also
List of Universal theme park attractions‎ 
List of lands at Universal theme parks

References

Universal Parks & Resorts attractions by name
Universal Parks & Resorts lists